Helen Bowater (b. 16 Nov 1952) is a New Zealand composer. She was born in Wellington into a musical family, and studied piano and violin  with Gwyneth Brown. In 1982 she graduated with a Bachelor of Music degree in music history and ethnomusicology from Victoria University of Wellington. She continued her studies in electroacoustic music with Ross Harris and in composition with Jack Body.

Bowater played in the Gamelan Padhang Moncar at Victoria University and her composition Tembang Matjapat (1999) is scored for gamelan and western strings and percussion instruments.

After completing her studies, Bowater worked as a singer, pianist and violinist with ensembles and choirs, and also worked in rock bands Extra Virgin Orchestra and pHonk and with the Victoria University Gamelan Padhang Moncar. She completed residencies at the Nelson School of Music and the Otago University in 1993, and was composer-in-residence with the Auckland Philharmonia in 1994, and at the New Zealand School of Music, Victoria University, in 2008-09.

Bowater has published professional articles in journals including Music in New Zealand. Her music has been performed internationally.

Honors and awards
Auckland Philharmonia Graduate Composer Workshops 1992	 	
Mozart Fellowship at Otago University 1993	 	
Auckland Philharmonia Composer in Residence 1994	 	
CANZ Trust Fund Award 1997	 	
SOUNZ Contemporary Award 1999	 	
SOUNZ Community Commission 2001	
NZSO-SOUNZ Readings 2003	
NZSO-SOUNZ Readings 2006	 	
Creative New Zealand/Jack C Richards Composer Residency, New Zealand School of Music 2008

Works
Selected works include:
Banshee for two violins, cello and piano	
He does not come, setting of 5 poems for soprano and ensemble	
Ixion's Wheel for B flat clarinet and piano	
Lautari for solo violin	
New Year Fanfare for orchestra	
River of Ocean for full orchestra	
Urwachst for orchestra	
Wire Dogs for solo piano
Nekhbet for solo piano
Monkey for Chinese sheng, Gamelan Padhang Moncar, singer, and string quartet

References

1952 births
Living people
20th-century classical composers
Women classical composers
New Zealand classical composers
Victoria University of Wellington alumni
People from Wellington City
20th-century women composers